is a railway station in Aki-ku, Hiroshima, Hiroshima Prefecture, Japan, operated by West Japan Railway Company (JR West).

Lines
Aki-Nakano Station is served by the Sanyō Main Line.

Layout
The station consists of one side platform with station office and one island platform on ground. The two platforms are connected by a footbridge.

See also
 List of railway stations in Japan

External links

  

Railway stations in Hiroshima Prefecture
Stations of West Japan Railway Company in Hiroshima city
Sanyō Main Line